Mahmudabad (also Romanized as Maḩmūdābād and Mahmood Abad; also known as Maḩmūdābād-e Moravvej and Moḩammadābād) is a village in Sharifabad Rural District, Koshkuiyeh District, Rafsanjan County, Kerman Province, Iran. At the 2006 census, its population was 720, in 168 families.

References 

Populated places in Rafsanjan County